Mauro Vinícius Hilário Lourenço da Silva, commonly known as Duda (born 26 December 1986) is a Brazilian long jumper. He is the 2-time World Indoor champion, winning the gold medal at the 2012 IAAF World Indoor Championships in Istanbul, Turkey, and again at the 2014 IAAF World Indoor Championships at Sopot, Poland, on 8 March 2014. He competed at the 2008 Olympic Games without reaching the final, but he did make the final 8 at the 2012 Summer Olympics in London.

Da Silva jumps off his left leg. His best jump outdoors is 8.31m (27 feet 3-1/4 inches), accomplished at São Paulo, Brazil, on 7 June 2013. His best jump indoors is 8.28 metres (27' 2"), first set on 9 March 2012 during the qualifying rounds of the 14th World Indoor Championships, and matched two years later on 8 March 2014 to win the 15th World Indoor title at Sopot, Poland. Those 8.28m jumps also established a new national indoor record for a Brazilian.

Da Silva's victories at the 2012 and 2014 World Indoor Championships were both come-from-behind wins. At Istanbul, he set a world-leading mark (and national record) of 8.28m during qualifying. But in the Finals the next day, he was in seventh place after his first four jumps, with a best of only 7.77m. On his fifth jump he uncorked 8.23m to take the lead, despite taking off well behind the take-off board (nearly 20 cm behind). In the sixth (final) round, Da Silva hit the take-off board squarely and again reached 8.23m. In the sixth round, Henry Frayne of Australia was in 3rd place but he leaped 8.23m to match Da Silva exactly. The tie-breaking rule thus came into effect, with the final placings decided on the basis of each jumper's second-best marks. Da Silva won the gold medal because of his two jumps of 8.23m, while Frayne's second-best was 8.17m (from the 2nd round). Russia's Aleksandr Menkov won bronze with his 8.22m, set in the 2nd round. Two years later at Sopot, Da Silva barely qualified for the Finals, jumping a season-best 8.02 on his third and final jump, to squeak into the top 8 by one centimeter. The next day he
defended his Indoor title at Sopot on 8 March 2014, again with a come-from-behind jump. He moved from 5th place to first on his sixth-and-final jump, overtaking both China’s Li Jinzhe (2nd with 8.23m) and Sweden’s Michel Torneus (3rd with 8.21m).

Personal bests

Outdoor
100 m: 10.40 (wind: +0.4 m/s) –  São Paulo, 20 June 2007
200 m: 21.02 (wind: -1.0 m/s) –  São Paulo, 20 August 2007
Long jump: 8.31 m (wind: +1.4 m/s) –  São Paulo, 7 June 2013

Achievements

References

External links

1986 births
Living people
Brazilian male long jumpers
Athletes (track and field) at the 2008 Summer Olympics
Athletes (track and field) at the 2012 Summer Olympics
Olympic athletes of Brazil
South American Games silver medalists for Brazil
South American Games bronze medalists for Brazil
South American Games medalists in athletics
Competitors at the 2006 South American Games
Competitors at the 2014 South American Games
World Athletics Indoor Championships winners
Sportspeople from São Paulo (state)